Güvercinli (Laz language: Bucha; ბუჩა) is a village in the Hopa District, Artvin Province, Turkey. Its population is 143 (2021).

References

Villages in Hopa District
Laz settlements in Turkey